Neoseiulus is a genus of mites in the Phytoseiidae family.

Species

Neoseiulus accessus (Ueckermann & Loots, 1988)
Neoseiulus aceriae (Gupta, 1975)
Neoseiulus aegyptocitri (Kandeel & El-Halawany, 1986)
Neoseiulus agrestis (Karg, 1960)
Neoseiulus akakius Beard, 2001
Neoseiulus aleurites Ragusa & Athias-Henriot, 1983
Neoseiulus alidis (Kolodochka, 1989)
Neoseiulus allenrolfius (Denmark, 1993)
Neoseiulus alpinus (Schweizer, 1922)
Neoseiulus alustoni (Livshitz & Kuznetsov, 1972)
Neoseiulus amicus (Chant, 1959)
Neoseiulus angeliquae (Schicha, 1987)
Neoseiulus anonymus (Chant & Baker, 1965)
Neoseiulus apeuthus Beard, 2001
Neoseiulus apkutik (Chant & Hansell, 1971)
Neoseiulus arcticus (Chant & Hansell, 1971)
Neoseiulus arenarius Denmark & Edland, 2002
Neoseiulus arenillus (Denmark & Muma, 1967)
Neoseiulus argillaceus (Kolodochka & Bondarenko, 1993)
Neoseiulus aridus (De Leon, 1962)
Neoseiulus arutunjani (Wainstein & Beglyarov, 1971)
Neoseiulus astutus (Beglyarov, 1960)
Neoseiulus atrii (Karg, 1989)
Neoseiulus atsak (Chant & Hansell, 1971)
Neoseiulus australograminis (Wainstein, 1977)
Neoseiulus balisungsongus (Schicha & Corpuz-Raros, 1992)
Neoseiulus baraki (Athias-Henriot, 1966)
Neoseiulus bariles (Schicha & Corpuz-Raros, 1992)
Neoseiulus barkeri Hughes, 1948
Neoseiulus baticola (Athias-Henriot, 1977)
Neoseiulus bayviewensis (Schicha, 1977)
Neoseiulus bellinus (Womersley, 1954)
Neoseiulus bellottii (Moraes & Mesa, 1988)
Neoseiulus benicus (El-Badry, 1968)
Neoseiulus benjamini (Schicha, 1981)
Neoseiulus bheraensis Chaudhri, Akbar & Rasool, 1979
Neoseiulus bicaudus (Wainstein, 1962)
Neoseiulus bindrai (Gupta, 1977)
Neoseiulus brevicalix (Karg, 1993)
Neoseiulus brevispinus (Kennett, 1958)
Neoseiulus brigarinus Beard, 2001
Neoseiulus buxeus Beard, 2001
Neoseiulus byssus Denmark & Knisley, in Knisley & Denmark 1978
Neoseiulus californicus (McGregor, 1954)
Neoseiulus callunae (Willmann, 1952)
Neoseiulus calorai (Corpuz-Raros & Rimando, 1966)
Neoseiulus camarus (El-Badry, 1968)
Neoseiulus campanus Beard, 2001
Neoseiulus cangaro (Schicha, 1987)
Neoseiulus caobae (De Leon, 1965)
Neoseiulus cappari Beard, 2001
Neoseiulus caribbeanus (De Leon, 1965)
Neoseiulus caruncula Chaudhri, Akbar & Rasool, 1979
Neoseiulus carverae (Schicha, 1993)
Neoseiulus casimiri (Schicha & Elshafie, 1980)
Neoseiulus cavagnaroi (Schuster, 1966)
Neoseiulus ceratoni (Ueckermann & Loots, 1988)
Neoseiulus certus (Kolodochka, 1990)
Neoseiulus chascomensis (Sheals, 1962)
Neoseiulus chaudhrii Chant & McMurtry, 2003
Neoseiulus chinensis Chant & McMurtry, 2003
Neoseiulus cinctutus (Livshitz & Kuznetsov, 1972)
Neoseiulus coatesi (Schultz, 1972)
Neoseiulus collegae (De Leon, 1962)
Neoseiulus comitatus (De Leon, 1962)
Neoseiulus communis Denmark & Edland, 2002
Neoseiulus conconiensis (Karg, 1976)
Neoseiulus constrictatus (El-Banhawy, 1984)
Neoseiulus conterminus (Kolodochka, 1990)
Neoseiulus corycus (Schuster, 1966)
Neoseiulus crataegi (Jorgensen & Chant, 1960)
Neoseiulus cree (Chant & Hansell, 1971)
Neoseiulus cryptomeriae (Zhu & Chen, 1983)
Neoseiulus cucumeris (Oudemans, 1930)
Neoseiulus cucumeroides (De Leon, 1959)
Neoseiulus culpus Denmark & Evans, in Denmark, Evans, Aguilar, Vargas & Ochoa 1999
Neoseiulus curvus (Wu & Li, 1985)
Neoseiulus cydnodactylon (Shehata & Zaher, 1969)
Neoseiulus cynodonae (Gupta, 1977)
Neoseiulus depilo Khan, Chaudhri & Khan, 1990
Neoseiulus desertus (Chant, 1957)
Neoseiulus dicircellatus (Wu & Ou, 1999)
Neoseiulus dieteri (Schicha, 1979)
Neoseiulus disparis (Chaudhri, Akbar & Rasool, 1979)
Neoseiulus dissipatus (Kolodochka, 1991)
Neoseiulus dodonaeae (Schicha, 1980)
Neoseiulus dungeri (Karg, 1977)
Neoseiulus echinochlovorus (Schicha & Corpuz-Raros, 1992)
Neoseiulus edestes Beard, 2001
Neoseiulus ellesmerei (Chant & Hansell, 1971)
Neoseiulus engaddensis (Amitai & Swirski, 1970)
Neoseiulus eremicus Chaudhri, Akbar & Rasool, 1979
Neoseiulus eremitus Beard, 2001
Neoseiulus erugatus Ragusa & Athias-Henriot, 1983
Neoseiulus esculentus (El-Badry, 1968)
Neoseiulus eucolli (Karg, 1993)
Neoseiulus exiguus (van der Merwe, 1968)
Neoseiulus extricatus (Kolodochka, 1991)
Neoseiulus fallacis (Garman, 1948)
Neoseiulus fallacoides Tuttle & Muma, 1973
Neoseiulus fauveli (Athias-Henriot, 1978)
Neoseiulus ficilocus (Schicha & Corpuz-Raros, 1992)
Neoseiulus ficusi (Gupta, 1986)
Neoseiulus foramenis (Karg, 1970)
Neoseiulus gansuensis (Wu & Lan, 1991)
Neoseiulus garciai (Schicha & Corpuz-Raros, 1992)
Neoseiulus ghanii (Muma, 1967)
Neoseiulus gracilentus (Hirschmann, 1962)
Neoseiulus gracilis (Muma, 1962)
Neoseiulus haimatus (Ehara, 1967)
Neoseiulus hamus (Karg, 1993)
Neoseiulus hanselli (Chant & Yoshida-Shaul, 1978)
Neoseiulus harrowi (Collyer, 1964)
Neoseiulus harveyi (McMurtry & Schicha, 1987)
Neoseiulus helmi (Schicha, 1987)
Neoseiulus herbarius (Wainstein, 1960)
Neoseiulus hirotae (Ehara, 1985)
Neoseiulus houstoni (Schicha, 1987)
Neoseiulus huffakeri (Schuster & Pritchard, 1963)
Neoseiulus huron (Chant & Hansell, 1971)
Neoseiulus idaeus Denmark & Muma, 1973
Neoseiulus imbricatus (Corpuz-Raros & Rimando, 1966)
Neoseiulus inabanus (Ehara, 1972)
Neoseiulus inak (Chant & Hansell, 1971)
Neoseiulus indicus (Narayanan & Kaur, 1960)
Neoseiulus inflatus (Kuznetsov, 1984)
Neoseiulus innuit (Chant & Hansell, 1971)
Neoseiulus inornatus (Schuster & Pritchard, 1963)
Neoseiulus insularis (Athias-Henriot, 1978)
Neoseiulus interfolius (De Leon, 1962)
Neoseiulus iroquois (Chant & Hansell, 1971)
Neoseiulus jiangxiensis (Zhu & Chen, 1982)
Neoseiulus kapjik (Chant & Hansell, 1971)
Neoseiulus kearnae Beard, 2001
Neoseiulus kennetti (Schuster & Pitchard, 1963)
Neoseiulus kermanicus Daneshvar, 1987
Neoseiulus kerri Muma, 1965
Neoseiulus kodryensis (Kolodochka, 1980)
Neoseiulus kolodotshkai (Kuznetsov, 1984)
Neoseiulus koyamanus (Ehara & Yokogawa, 1977)
Neoseiulus krugeri (van der Merwe, 1968)
Neoseiulus lablabi (Ghai & Menon, 1967)
Neoseiulus lamticus (Athias-Henriot, 1977)
Neoseiulus lateralis (Tuttle & Muma, 1973)
Neoseiulus latoventris (Karg & Edland, 1987)
Neoseiulus lecki Beard, 2001
Neoseiulus leigongshanensis (Wu & Lan, 1989)
Neoseiulus letrauformis (Schicha & Corpuz-Raros, 1992)
Neoseiulus leucophaeus (Athias-Henriot, 1959)
Neoseiulus liangi Chant & McMurtry, 2003
Neoseiulus liticellus (Athias-Henriot, 1966)
Neoseiulus longilaterus (Athias-Henriot, 1957)
Neoseiulus longisiphonulus (Wu & Lan, 1989)
Neoseiulus longispinosus (Evans, 1952)
Neoseiulus loxtoni (Schicha, 1979)
Neoseiulus loxus (Schuster & Pritchard, 1963)
Neoseiulus lula (Pritchard & Baker, 1962)
Neoseiulus luppovae (Wainstein, 1962)
Neoseiulus lushanensis (Zhu & Chen, 1985)
Neoseiulus lyrinus Beard, 2001
Neoseiulus maigsius (Schicha & Corpuz-Raros, 1992)
Neoseiulus makedonicus (Papadoulis & Emmanouel, 1991)
Neoseiulus makilingensis (Schicha & Corpuz-Raros, 1992)
Neoseiulus makuwa (Ehara, 1972)
Neoseiulus malaban Beard, 2001
Neoseiulus marginatus (Wainstein, 1961)
Neoseiulus marinellus (Muma, 1962)
Neoseiulus marinus (Willmann, 1952)
Neoseiulus martinicensis Moraes & Kreiter, in Moraes, Kreiter & Lofego 2000
Neoseiulus mazurensis (Kropczynska, 1965)
Neoseiulus melaleucae (McMurtry & Schicha, 1987)
Neoseiulus melinis Lofego & Moraes, 2003
Neoseiulus micmac (Chant & Hansell, 1971)
Neoseiulus mistassini (Chant & Hansell, 1971)
Neoseiulus monomacroseta (Tseng, 1976)
Neoseiulus montanus (Wainstein, 1962)
Neoseiulus montanus Tuttle & Muma, 1973
Neoseiulus msabahaensis (Moraes & McMurtry, 1989)
Neoseiulus muganicus (Abbasova, 1970)
Neoseiulus multiporus (Wu & Li, 1987)
Neoseiulus mumae (Shehata & Zaher, 1969)
Neoseiulus mumai (Denmark, 1965)
Neoseiulus myrtea Chaudhri, Akbar & Rasool, 1979
Neoseiulus namurensis (Fain, Vangeluwe, Degreef & Wauthy, 1993)
Neoseiulus neoaurescens (Moraes & Mesa, 1988)
Neoseiulus neoparaki (Ehara, 1972)
Neoseiulus neoreticuloides (Liang & Hu, 1988)
Neoseiulus neotunus (Denmark & Muma, 1973)
Neoseiulus nescapi (Chant & Hansell, 1971)
Neoseiulus nodus Denmark & Knisley, in Knisley & Denmark 1978
Neoseiulus noosae (McMurtry & Schicha, 1987)
Neoseiulus novaescotiae (Chant, 1959)
Neoseiulus ojibwa (Chant & Hansell, 1971)
Neoseiulus orientalis (El-Halawany & Kandeel, 1985)
Neoseiulus ornatus (Athias-Henriot, 1957)
Neoseiulus oryzacolus Daneshvar, 1987
Neoseiulus ostium Khan, Chaudhri & Khan, 1990
Neoseiulus paloratus Beard, 2001
Neoseiulus pannuceus Beard, 2001
Neoseiulus papenfussi (Schuster, 1966)
Neoseiulus paraibensis (Moraes & McMurtry, 1983)
Neoseiulus paraki (Ehara, 1967)
Neoseiulus paramarinus Evans, 1988
Neoseiulus parvipilis (Athias-Henriot, 1978)
Neoseiulus paspalivorus (De Leon, 1957)
Neoseiulus pegasus (Schuster, 1966)
Neoseiulus perfectus (Chaudhri, 1968)
Neoseiulus perspectus (Kolodochka, 1992)
Neoseiulus peruanas (El-Banhawy, 1979)
Neoseiulus phragmitidis (Bozai, 1997)
Neoseiulus picanus (Ragusa, 2000)
Neoseiulus pieteri (Schultz, 1972)
Neoseiulus placitus (Khan & Chaudhri, 1969)
Neoseiulus planatus (Muma, 1962)
Neoseiulus plantagenis (Kolodochka, 1981)
Neoseiulus pluridentatus Lofego & Moraes, 2003
Neoseiulus poculi (Karg, 1976)
Neoseiulus populi (Bozai, 1997)
Neoseiulus pristisimilis (Karg, 1993)
Neoseiulus provectus (Kolodochka, 1991)
Neoseiulus pseudaequipilus (Wainstein & Abbasova, 1974)
Neoseiulus pseudoherbarius Meshkov, 1994
Neoseiulus pseudoumbraticus (Chant & Yoshida-Shaul, 1982)
Neoseiulus pulupotus (Schicha & Corpuz-Raros, 1992)
Neoseiulus quaesitus (Wainstein & Beglyarov, 1971)
Neoseiulus queenslandensis (McMurtry & Schicha, 1987)
Neoseiulus rambami (Swirski & Amitai, 1990)
Neoseiulus rancidus (Chaudhri, Akbar & Rasool, 1979)
Neoseiulus rarosi (Schicha & Corpuz-Raros, 1992)
Neoseiulus recifensis Gondim Jr. & Moraes, 2001
Neoseiulus reductus (Wainstein, 1962)
Neoseiulus reticulatus (Oudemans, 1930)
Neoseiulus reticuloides (Wainstein, 1975)
Neoseiulus ribes Denmark & Edland, 2002
Neoseiulus rimandoi (Schicha & Corpuz-Raros, 1992)
Neoseiulus rufus Denmark & Evans, in Denmark, Evans, Aguilar, Vargas & Ochoa 1999
Neoseiulus salicicola (Bozai, 1997)
Neoseiulus salish (Chant & Hansell, 1971)
Neoseiulus saudiensis  Negm, Alatawi & Aldryhim, 2012
Neoseiulus scapilatus (van der Merwe, 1965)
Neoseiulus scoticus (Collyer, 1957)
Neoseiulus segnis (Wainstein & Arutunjan, 1970)
Neoseiulus sehlabati (El-Banhawy, 2002)
Neoseiulus septentrionalis (Karg, 1977)
Neoseiulus setulus (Fox, 1947)
Neoseiulus shambati (El-Badry, 1968)
Neoseiulus shanksi Congdon, 2002
Neoseiulus sharonensis (Rivnay & Swirski, 1980)
Neoseiulus shiheziensis (Wu & Li, 1987)
Neoseiulus simplexus (Denmark & Knisley, 1978)
Neoseiulus sinaiticum (Amitai & Swirski, 1982)
Neoseiulus sioux (Chant & Hansell, 1971)
Neoseiulus sospesitis (Khan & Chaudhri, 1969)
Neoseiulus sparaktes Beard, 2001
Neoseiulus specus Beard, 2001
Neoseiulus spicatus Denmark & Evans, in Denmark, Evans, Aguilar, Vargas & Ochoa 1999
Neoseiulus spineus (Tseng, 1976)
Neoseiulus sporobolus Tuttle & Muma, 1973
Neoseiulus steinerae Beard, 2001
Neoseiulus stolidus (Chaudhri, 1968)
Neoseiulus striatus (Wu, 1983)
Neoseiulus subreticulatus (Wu, 1987)
Neoseiulus subrotundus (Wu & Lan, 1991)
Neoseiulus subsolidus (Beglyarov, 1960)
Neoseiulus sugonjaevi (Wainstein & Abbasova, 1974)
Neoseiulus suknaensis (Gupta, 1970)
Neoseiulus swartii Zack, 1969
Neoseiulus tabis (Schuster & Pritchard, 1963)
Neoseiulus tabularis Chaudhri, Akbar & Rasool, 1979
Neoseiulus taiwanicus (Ehara, 1970)
Neoseiulus tareensis (Schicha, 1983)
Neoseiulus tauricus (Livshitz & Kuznetsov, 1972)
Neoseiulus teke (Pritchard & Baker, 1962)
Neoseiulus tenuisetae (Karg, 1993)
Neoseiulus tervus Meshkov, 1994
Neoseiulus thwaitei (Schicha, 1977)
Neoseiulus tibielingmiut (Chant & Hansell, 1971)
Neoseiulus tobon (Chant & Hansell, 1971)
Neoseiulus tornadus (Tuttle & Muma, 1973)
Neoseiulus transversus Denmark & Muma, 1973
Neoseiulus triangularis (Karg, 1994)
Neoseiulus tshernovi (Kuznetsov, 1984)
Neoseiulus tunus (De Leon, 1967)
Neoseiulus turangae (Kolodochka, 1982)
Neoseiulus tuvinensis (Beglyarov & Meshkov, 1988)
Neoseiulus tyrrelli (Chant & Hansell, 1971)
Neoseiulus ulatei Denmark & Evans, in Denmark, Evans, Aguilar, Vargas & Ochoa 1999
Neoseiulus uliginosus (Karg, 1976)
Neoseiulus umbraticus (Chant, 1956)
Neoseiulus umsteadi (Muma, Metz & Farrier, 1967)
Neoseiulus vallis (Schuster & Pritchard, 1963)
Neoseiulus vanderlindei (van der Merwe, 1965)
Neoseiulus vardgesi (Arutunjan, 1968)
Neoseiulus vasoides (Karg, 1989)
Neoseiulus vehementis (Khan & Chaudhri, 1969)
Neoseiulus veigai Gondim Jr. & Moraes, 2001
Neoseiulus venustus (Chaudhri, 1968)
Neoseiulus versutus (Beglyarov, 1981)
Neoseiulus wanrooyae Beard, 2001
Neoseiulus warrum Beard, 2001
Neoseiulus wearnei (Schicha, 1987)
Neoseiulus womersleyi (Schicha, 1975)
Neoseiulus xizangensis (Zhu & Chen, 1985)
Neoseiulus yanoi (Ehara, 1972)
Neoseiulus zwoelferi (Dosse, 1957)

References

Phytoseiidae